Qərvənd (also, Qərbənd) is a village in the Fuzuli District of Azerbaijan, around 9km northeast of Fuzuli City. The site is currently uninhabited.

Following the First Nagorno-Karabakh War, the village fell under the occupation of the unrecognized Republic of Artsakh since August 1993 as a part of its Hadrut Province.

During the 2020 Nagorno-Karabakh conflict, the Ministry of Defence of Azerbaijan announced that it had retaken the village on 27 September 2020. A video released a few weeks later showed that the village was now little more than a scattering of very degraded ruins.

References

External links 

Populated places in Fuzuli District